The Mongolian gerbil or Mongolian jird (Meriones unguiculatus) is a small rodent belonging to the subfamily Gerbillinae. Their body size is typically , with a  tail, and body weight , with adult males larger than females. The animal is used in science and kept as a small house pet. Their use in science dates back to the latter half of the 19th century, but they only started to be kept as pets in the English-speaking world after 1954, when they were brought to the United States. However, their use in scientific research has fallen out of favor.

Habitat
Mongolian gerbils inhabit grassland, shrubland and desert, including semidesert and steppes in China, Mongolia, and the Russian Federation.

Soil on the steppes is sandy and is covered with grasses, herbs, and shrubs. The steppes have cool, dry winters and hot summers.

In the wild, these gerbils live in patriarchal groups generally consisting of one parental pair, the most recent litter, and a few older pups, sometimes the dominant female's sister(s) also live with them. Only the dominant females will produce pups, and will mostly mate with the dominant male while in estrus (heat), female gerbils are generally more loyal than male gerbils.

A group lives in a central burrow with 10–20 exits. Some deeper burrows with only one to three exits in their territory may exist. These deeper burrows are used to escape from predators when they are too far from the central burrow. A group's burrows often interconnect with other groups.

History
The first known mention of gerbils came in 1866, by Father Armand David, who sent "yellow rats" to the French National Museum of Natural History in Paris, from northern China. They were named Gerbillus unguiculatus by the scientist Alphonse Milne-Edwards in 1867.

There is a popular misconception about the meaning of this scientific name, appearing both in printed works and in websites, due to the genus Meriones sharing the name with Greek warrior Meriones in Homer's Iliad; however, translations like "clawed warrior" are incorrect. The genus was named by Johann Karl Wilhelm Illiger in 1811, deriving from the Greek word μηρος (femur). Combined with 'unguiculate', meaning to have claws or nails in Latin, the name can be loosely translated as 'clawed femur'.

Gerbils only became popular pets in the English-speaking world after 1954, when 20 males and 26 females were brought to the United States from eastern Mongolia for scientific testing. Almost all pet gerbils today are descended from them. Gerbils were brought to the United Kingdom in 1964 from the United States.

In science
Gerbils have a long history of use in scientific research, although nowadays they are rarely used. For example, in the United Kingdom in 2017, only around 300 Mongolian gerbils were used in experimental procedures, compared to over 2 million mice.

Tumblebrook Farm 
Most gerbils used in scientific research are derived from the Tumblebrook Farm strain, which has its origins in 20 pairs of wild-caught Mongolian gerbils sent to Japan in 1935. Eleven of these animals were subsequently sent to Tumblebrook Farm in the USA, with additional animals later sent to Charles River Ltd in Italy in 1996.

Hearing 
Gerbils have a wide hearing range, from detection of low frequency foot drumming to higher frequency chirps and therefore may be a more suitable model of human hearing loss than mice and rats, which are high-frequency specialists.

Vocal 
Male gerbils can produce ultrasonic sounds with frequencies ranging from approximately 27 to 35 kHz and amplitudes ranging from approximately 0 to 70 dBa. Their larynx is involved in the production of these ultrasonic sounds. Experimentation revealed five findings of interest, which are that adults only emit ultrasonic sounds when stimulated socially, males signal more frequently than females, dominant males are more active in vocalizations than subordinate males, ultrasounds are triggered by conspecific odors, and that d-amphetamine, a central nervous system stimulant, contributes high levels of ultrasounds while chlorpromazine, an antipsychotic medication, lowers the emission rate.

Epilepsy 
10–20% of gerbils exhibit spontaneous epileptiform seizures, typically in response to a stressor such as handling or cage cleaning. Epilepsy in gerbils has a genetic basis, and seizure-prone and seizure-resistant lines have been bred.

Diabetes 
Like other desert rodents such as fat sandrats, Mongolian gerbils are susceptible to diet-induced diabetes, although incidence is low. A diabetes-prone line has recently been generated, showing that gerbil diabetes has at least some genetic basis.

Genetics and genomics 
Laboratory gerbils are derived from a small number of founders, and so genetic diversity was generally assumed to be low. Initial genetic studies based on small numbers of genetic markers appeared to support this, but more recent genome-wide Genotyping-by-Sequencing (GBS) data has shown that genetic diversity is actually quite high. It has been suggested that laboratory gerbils should be considered domesticated, and designated "M. unguiculatus forma domestica" to differentiate them from wild animals. A Mongolian gerbil genome sequence was published in 2018 and a genetic map comprising 22 linkage groups (one per chromosome) in 2019.

Reproduction

These rodents are widely used as subjects of testing within laboratories for a plethora of different reasons. These rodents are susceptible to carrying diseases and infections some transmitted sexually, much the subject of many experiments within labs. In the wild, Wild Mongolian gerbils breed during the months of February and October. Males do not become sexually mature for about 70–80 days, while the vaginal opening occurs in females about 33–50 days after birth. For other gerbils such as the hairy footed gerbil, sexual maturity has a slightly earlier and longer window of 60-90 days in comparison with a later and shorter window for Mongolian gerbils, 70–84 days. Females reach sexual maturity shortly after this opening occurs. They experience oestrus cycles every 4–6 days. Mongolian gerbils are regarded as monogamous within science. Even with this said, many Mongolian Gerbils have still been found in laboratory tests regarding their sexual reproduction behavior to have shown signs of promiscuity and mating with other females while their monogamous partner is absent in laboratory setting. Gerbils are for the most part selective when it comes to picking a mate for copulation; though their selection process occurs more rapid than other species due to the high amount of gerbil population and shorter life span. An average litter size for the Mongilian Gerbil would be around 4–8 pups, if the litter only contains around 1–2 young then the mother will neglect them and they will die from starvation. Mongolian Gerbils are monogamous and mate with their selected partner for the rest of their time together, when one becomes widowed many gerbils refrain from seeking other mates to reproduce with. Males generally find new mates whereas females may not. When older females lose their mate they almost always give up on seeking reproduction. Their behavior tends to vary when faced with different settings, within the wild finding and selecting a mate is not a problem at all due to the high frequency of mates. Within a laboratory setting many gerbils tend to keep to themselves and refrain from copulation.

Behavior
Gerbils are social animals, and live in groups in the wild. They rely on their sense of smell to identify other members of their clan, so it is important to use what is commonly referred to as the "split tank method" (or splitcaging) when introducing gerbils from separate litters. Gerbils are known to attack and often kill those carrying an unfamiliar scent.

As pets

A gentle and hardy animal, the Mongolian gerbil has become a popular small house pet. It was first brought from China to Paris in the 19th century, and became a popular house pet there. It was later brought to the United States in 1954 by Dr. Victor Schwentker for use in research. Dr. Schwentker soon recognized their potential as pet animals. Selective breeding for the pet trade has resulted in a wide range of different color and pattern varieties. Gerbils became popular pets in the US around the late 1950s and were imported to the United Kingdom in 1964, where they became popular pets too. They are now found in pet shops throughout the UK and the US.

However, due to the threat they pose to indigenous ecosystems and existing agricultural operations, it is illegal to purchase, import, or keep a gerbil as a pet in the U.S. state of California. It is also illegal to import the animal into New Zealand.

Housing in captivity
Mongolian gerbils prefer to live in pairs or groups rather than alone. They are social and gentle, and do not bite readily. As diggers and tunnel-makers they are better suited to a tank with a deep substrate or bedding rather than a hamster cage, since the absorbent substrate is liable to be kicked up and out of a cage quickly.

Mongolian gerbils like to chew objects to file their perpetually growing teeth, like all rodents, and need plenty of cardboard items and chew toys; the cardboard will be chewed up in to bedding and mixed with the substrate. Plastic toys and tunnels should be avoided in-case of ingestion. Fresh vegetables should be included in small amounts as an excess may cause diarrhoea. Some vegetables are toxic to gerbils, including potatoes, onions, cabbage; a diet based on multiple seeds, e.g millet and alfalfa pellet mix is sufficient.

Water should be provided with a drip-feed system to prevent accidental build-up of harmful mould in the tank environment. Care should be taken not to introduce new smells suddenly into the tank, because the tank is considered by the gerbils to be their territory. Gerbils are active and appreciate a running or exercise wheel. Repetitive corner digging can be minimized by providing tunnels while gerbils are in their young, formative months. As with most animals, they appreciate a secure, private area that is dark for sleeping.

A common misunderstanding when purchasing a home for pet gerbils is they can live in housing designed for hamsters and mice. This is not correct, as they need to be able to dig tunnel systems. The common plastic items inside of hamster and mouse cages is inappropriate for gerbils due to their ability to gnaw through it very quickly. Plastic can cause serious health issues for all animals if ingested, therefore many owners refrain from having any plastic in the tank and rely entirely on wooden toys. Information from gerbil societies from throughout the globe is conflicting with regards to tank sizing.

Reasons for popularity

The several reasons for the popularity of gerbils as household pets include: The animals are typically not aggressive, and they rarely bite unprovoked or without stress. They are small and easy to handle, since they are sociable creatures that enjoy the company of humans and other gerbils. Gerbils also have adapted their kidneys to produce a minimum of waste to conserve body fluids, which makes them very clean with little odor.  Gerbils have many different aesthetic coat patterns, such as pied slate, described below.

Health concerns

Teeth problems
Misalignment of incisors due to injury or malnutrition may result in overgrowth, which can cause injury to the roof of the mouth. Symptoms include a dropped or loss of appetite, drooling, weight loss, or foul breath. The teeth must be clipped by a veterinarian regularly for as long as required.

Trauma
Common injuries are caused by gerbils being dropped or falling, often while inside of a hamster ball, which can cause broken limbs or a fractured spine (for which there is no cure).

Neglect
A common problem for all small rodents is neglect, which can cause the gerbils to not receive adequate food and water, causing serious health concerns, including dehydration, starvation, stomach ulcers, eating of bedding material, and cannibalism.

Epilepsy
Between 20 and 50% of pet gerbils have the seizure disorder epilepsy. The seizures are thought to be caused by fright, handling, or a new environment. The attacks can be mild to severe, but do not typically appear to have any long-term effects, except for rare cases where death results from very severe seizures. A way to prevent a gerbil from having a seizure is to refrain from blowing in the animal's face (often used to "train" the pet not to bite).  This technique is used in a lab environment to induce seizures for medical research.

Tumors
Tumors, both benign and malignant, are fairly common in pet gerbils, and are most common in females over the age of two. Usually, the tumors involve the ovaries, causing an extended abdomen, or the skin, with tumors most often developing around the ears, feet, midabdomen, and base of the tail, appearing as a lump or abscess. The scent gland (positioned on the abdomen) should be checked regularly; a veterinarian can operate on the lump where possible.

Tail sloughing
Gerbils can lose their tails due to improper handling, being attacked by another animal, or getting their tails stuck. The first sign is a loss of fur from the tip of the tail, then, the skinless tail dies off and sloughs, with the stump usually healing without complications.

Tyzzer's disease
The most common infectious disease in gerbils is Tyzzer's disease, a bacterial disease, which stress can make animals more susceptible to. It produces symptoms such as ruffled fur, lethargy, hunched posture, poor appetite, diarrhoea, and often death. It quickly spreads between gerbils in close contact.

Deafness and inner ear problems
A problem with the inner ear can be spotted by a gerbil leaning to one side quite obviously. The fluids in the ears affect balance. However, this does not appear to affect the gerbils too much, which have an attitude of just getting on with things, and getting used to their conditions. Gerbils with "extreme white spotting" colouring are susceptible to deafness; this is thought to be due to the lack of pigmentation in and around the ear.

Captive-bred gerbils

Many color varieties of gerbils are available in pet shops today, generally the result of years of selective breeding.

Over 20 different coat colors occur in the Mongolian gerbil, which has been captive-bred the longest.

Another species of gerbil has also been recently introduced to the pet industry: the fat-tailed gerbil, or duprasi. They are smaller than the common Mongolian gerbils, and have long, soft coats and short, fat tails, appearing more like a hamster. The variation on the normal duprasi coat is more gray in color, which may be a mutation, or it may be the result of hybrids between the Egyptian and Algerian subspecies of duprasi.

White spotting has been reported in not only the Mongolian gerbil, but also the pallid gerbil and possibly Sundervall's Jird.

A long-haired mutation, a grey agouti or chinchilla mutation, white spotting, and possibly a dilute mutation have also appeared in Shaw's jirds, and white spotting and a dilute mutation have shown up in bushy-tailed jirds.

Coat colours

References

External links

 The National Gerbil Society (U.K.)
 The American Gerbil Society
 The Gerbils.com – Everything about the gerbil
 The Underwhite/Underwhite Dense gene
 eGerbil - For everything gerbil!

Meriones (rodent)
Rodents of Asia
Mammals described in 1867
Space-flown life